Presidential elections were held in Liberia in May 1881. The result was a victory for incumbent President Anthony W. Gardiner of the True Whig Party against Republican nominee Joseph James Cheeseman.

References

Liberia
1881 in Liberia
Elections in Liberia
One-party elections
May 1881 events
Election and referendum articles with incomplete results